Camissoniopsis lewisii is a species of evening primrose known by the common name Lewis' evening primrose. It is native to southern California and Baja California, where it grows in coastal habitat and on the grasslands of the inland mountain ranges. as an example occurrence in Baja California, C. lewisii occurs in association with Mimulus aridus and Adiantum jordanii.

Description
This is an annual herb producing a hairy stem up to about half a meter long which may be erect and unbranched or spreading along the ground and branching. The leaves are arranged in a basal rosette and are several centimeters long; there are also leaves along the stem. The nodding inflorescence produces flowers with yellow petals a few millimeters long with one or two red spots at the bases. The fruit is coiled and one to two centimeters long.

Notes

References
 C. Michael Hogan. 2008. Coastal Woodfern (Dryopteris arguta), GlobalTwitcher, ed. N. Stromberg
 Jepson Manual. 1993. Jepson Manual Treatment: Camissonia lewisii

External links
 Photo gallery

lewisii
Flora of California
Flora of Baja California
Plants described in 1969
Flora without expected TNC conservation status